Tich Button is a 2022 Pakistani comedy drama film, directed by Qasim Ali Mureed in his feature film directorial debut and produced by Salman Iqbal and Urwa Hocane in her debut production. It stars Farhan Saeed, Iman Ali, Feroze Khan and Sonya Hussyn. The film is released on 25 November 2022.

The principal photography of the film began in February 2019. It was scheduled to be released on Eid al-Fitr 2020, but was postponed due to the COVID-19 pandemic, then later it was released on 25 November 2022.

Plot 
Kaka, a young man, helps Saqib when he refuses to marry his cousin Shakeela. As a result of this refusal, complications kick in and a pile of lies generate. As the story unfolds, Leena, a girl from Turkey enters this triangle and what follows is a story of mishaps and love.

Cast 
 Farhan Saeed as Kaka Sahab
 Iman Ali as Leena
 Feroze Khan as Saqib
 Sonya Hussyn as Shakeela
 Samiya Mumtaz as Kulsoom
 Sohail Ahmed as Choudhary Nijaz
 Humaira Ali as Parveen
 Marhoom Ahmad Bilal as Bhatti
 Marina Khan as Pammi
 Noor ul Hassan as Iqbal
 Gul-e-Rana as Saqib's mother 
 Qavi Khan as Dada
 Raheela Agha as Dadi
 Ali Sikander as Kaka's friend
 Urwa Hocane as Special appearance in item song "Pretty Face"

Production
The principal photography began in February 2019.

Reception 
Fatima Awan gave a mostly positive review, highlighting Farhan Saeed's performance and the script while calling Feroze Khan's performance "the weakest link".

References

External links 
 

Urdu-language Pakistani films
Pakistani romantic comedy films
Lollywood films
Films postponed due to the COVID-19 pandemic
2020s Urdu-language films
2020s romantic comedy films